The National Premier League is a netball league in England.

The league was founded at the start of the 2006/2007 season, as a replacement for the National Clubs League.  Like its predecessor, it is the second level of play in the sport in England, below the Netball Superleague.  When it was founded, it had two divisions, then for the 2010/2011 season, it expanded to three divisions, each with ten teams.  Each season, the top two teams in divisions 2 and 3 are promoted to the division above, and the bottom two teams in each division are relegated.

Premier 1 Champions
2006/07:
2007/08: Linden
2008/09: Team Bath
2009/10: Academy
2010/11: Academy
2011/12: Oldham
2012/13: Oldham
2013/14: Oldham
2014/15: Oldham
2015/16: Academy
2016/17: Oldham
2017/18: Oldham
2018/19: Oldham
2019/20: Oldham
2020/21: Oldham
2021/22: Oldham

References

Sports leagues established in 2006
Netball competitions in England